The Christian Democrats (KD) is a Christian-democratic political party in Sweden founded in March 1964. It first entered parliament in 1985, through electoral cooperation with the Centre Party, and in 1991 broke through to win seats by itself. The party leader since 25 April 2015 has been Ebba Busch. She succeeded Göran Hägglund, who had been leader since 2004.

The KD was a minor party in the centre-right Alliance coalition government led by Prime Minister Fredrik Reinfeldt between 2006 and 2014 and later a part of the centre-right opposition until it dissolved in January 2019. Since 2021 the KD mainly cooperates with the Moderate Party, Liberals and the Sweden Democrats.

Ideology 
According to the party their five most important policy issues include:

 Healthcare: reform the healthcare system and nationalise Swedish healthcare. Improve care guarantee. Reform the queue billion. Save LSS.
 Elderly care: retirement home guarantee as well as an abolished pensions tax. The KD also supports housing supplements for the elderly. The Christian Democrats especially emphasize the elderly's right to a dignified life and want to introduce a higher standard for nursing homes.
 Safety: more police officers and more resources to the police. The party also supports law and order policies, such as increasing resources for the police and stricter laws against sexual crimes and honor killings.
 Family: enable more time for the children, facilitate family formation, increase families' room for maneuver, upgrade parenthood, enable different forms of childcare and strengthen the finances of families with children. The party supports freedom of choice of parents for education and increased resources for schools in deprived areas.
 Integration: according to the party, jobs are one of the keys to good integration and that a society is built on a common set of values, where certain values are immutable.

KD's platform and policies have been shaped by the tenets of Christian democracy, stewardship, and the shared responsibility between the church and political institutions, the responsibility of solidarity towards fellow human beings and the safeguarding of civil society, permeated with socially and culturally conservative values.

The KD support reducing petrol prices and abolishing property tax. The KD supports the monarchy.

The Christian Democrats want a flexible immigration policy, but one that is regulated and controlled. The party names a Nordic level when it comes to immigration, meaning the amount of refugees that enter Sweden should be at the same level as in the other Nordic countries. The KD also calls for a socially just but efficient asylum policy in which resources can be allocated to those in need in tandem with faster screening and quicker deportation of those who fail or abuse the asylum claiming processes, as well as increased spending on border patrol police.  It also wants to introduce a special integration committee in the Riksdag and compulsory measures for refugees to learn Swedish and adopt Swedish customs and social norms. Since 2018, the party has pledged a tougher line against immigration and multiculturalism, including opposing the Islamic call to prayer in public spaces.

On foreign policy, the KD is largely supportive of Sweden's membership of the European Union. They were in favour of entering the eurozone during the 2003 Swedish euro referendum, but after the “No” side won the referendum in a landslide victory the party changed its stance and are now against joining the eurozone. They are calling for "a narrower and sharper EU" and that "on a number of issues, the EU need to take a step back and give more power back to the nation states”. In the European Parliament, the KD sits with the European People's Party and is a member of Centrist Democrat International internationally which contains other Christian democratic parties.

History

Reasons for founding the party
The party had its roots in a movement against the Swedish government's decision in 1963 to remove religious education from the elementary school syllabus. An organisation called "Christian Social Responsibility", which would later become the Christian Democratic Unity, organised several marches against the decision, one of which became one of the largest in Swedish modern history. Despite the public outcry and over 2.1 million protest signatures, the decision went through. The group that had worked in the campaign felt it was a sign that Swedish politics needed a Christian Democratic Party.

The political and social origins of the Swedish Christian Democrats clearly differ from those of the European continental Christian Democratic parties (as in Italy or Germany). In those countries, Christian Democracy represented the mainstream of the social-conservative political forces and was closely tied to majoritarian religious practice. In Sweden, however, Christian Democracy emerged as a minority grouping amongst the centre-right forces and was tied to minority-religious tendencies in society (particularly among voters associated with the Free Churches and likeminded Lutherans).

Founding
In the beginning of 1964 Lewi Pethrus, founder of the Swedish Pentecostal movement and chief editor of the Swedish newspaper Dagen, discussed the idea of a Swedish Christian democratic party on the editorial pages of Dagen. He stated that many people had contacted him about the idea and that the current Swedish political climate was dominated by atheist economic materialism.

Principal Algot Tergel hosted a conference on 7 February of the same year. The topic of the conference was "Christianity and Politics", and during the conference the idea of starting a Christian Democratic Party was discussed. A committee consisting of Pethrus and eight other Free Church leaders was formed.

A large and widespread debate followed the decision to create the committee. Dagen published an interview with Kjell Bondevik, the leader of the Norwegian Christian Democratic Party, and there were talks about creating a Christian Democratic Party in Finland as well.

On 20 March 1964 the party was founded as Christian Democratic Unity. At first it was only an organisation, but at a board meeting later that year it was decided that the organisation would be revamped into a party and that it would compete in the national elections in Sweden. The first roughly 100 members elected Birger Ekstedt to the post of party chair and Lewi Pethrus to the post of vice chair.

The party grew rapidly; by the end of the year it had 14,500 members.

Early start
During its early years the KDS was sometimes called the "Air and Water" party because of its strong emphasis on environmental politics. At that time the Green Party of Sweden did not exist, and thus the Christian Democratic Unity had a unique appeal with its environmentally friendly policies. In the Swedish national elections of 1964 the party gained 1.8% of the vote, not enough to get any seats in the Riksdag, but the party already had influence at the municipal level. In the municipal elections of 1966 the party gained 354 seats.

At this time the established major parties of Sweden began discussing new ways of making it more difficult for minor parties to enter the Riksdag. In 1971 the Riksdag was reformed, and with this came the D'Hondt method of allocating seats. The threshold was set at 4%, which meant that the political breakthrough was far away for the KDS.

Birger Ekstedt died in 1972, aged 51, only a few days after having been reelected as the party chair. An emergency congress was called; there Alf Svensson, the relatively unknown chair of the youth wing of the party, was elected chair. Svensson was to become one of the most important figures in modern Swedish politics. In the national elections of 1973 the party gained 1.8% of the vote, the same result as in the two preceding elections.

Before the national elections of 1976 there was a strong call for a change to a right-wing government in Sweden. The organisation "Vote right-wing" was formed to promote the change to a right-wing government. The KDS, however, announced a desire not to be placed on the traditional right-wing/left-wing scale, a measurement system it felt was outdated. Therefore, the "Vote right-wing" organisation started a campaign of negative campaigning against the KDS with the slogan "Don't vote for KDS, don't throw away your vote" as the KDS had not reached the 4% threshold at the last elections. The effect of this large campaign on a small and relatively new party like the KDS was disastrous, and it gained only 1.4% of the vote in the 1976 election.

At the start of the 1980s, the party revamped its entire political manifesto. The party abandoned its conservative stance on abortion and instead assumed a moderate pro-choice stance and adopted a plank to work to lower the total number of abortions in Sweden through encouragement of individual voluntary measures instead. In the 1980 nuclear power referendums the party supported the "no" campaign, which meant opposing any further construction of new nuclear power-plants in Sweden and advocating the phasing-out of all nuclear power plants in Sweden within 10 years, together with increased investments in alternative energy.

In 1982 the Christian Democratic Women's league was founded, and the party gained 1.9% of the votes, for the first time getting more than 100,000 votes.

Way into the Riksdag
As early as 1978 the KDS discussed the idea of electoral cooperation with the Centre Party. Similar ideas were discussed before the 1982 elections but were never put into action. One of the proponents of such a collaboration was the then secretary of information Mats Odell. The party officially took a stance against a socialist government, which effectively put them together with the right-wing block.

The negotiations were difficult, but in 1984 the Centre Party and KDS agreed to run under a joint banner in the next year's elections under the name   ("The Centre").

The deal, which was heavily criticised by the Swedish Social Democratic Party, meant that each party had its own voting ticket but that the Centre Party should nominate a Christian Democratic candidate on at least five of the regional candidacy lists. The Centre Party ticket would win over the KDS ticket almost everywhere, but this way there would be at least five Christian Democrats in the Riksdag. The Centre Party did not fulfil its promise, however, and put a Christian Democrat on the list only in the municipality of Kalmar. This resulted in great tensions within the Christian Democrats; one of the party icons, the environmental activist Björn Gillberg, left the party. However, Alf Svensson managed to get into the Riksdag through the KDS party ticket in Jönköping.

Real breakthrough
In 1987 the party manifesto was revamped once again (although not so heavily as the last time), and the party changed its name to Christian Democratic Social Party, while keeping the KDS abbreviation. In the 1988 national elections the party grew significantly and gained 2.8% of the votes. But the Centre Party did not wish any further electoral cooperation, and Alf Svensson had to leave the Riksdag. Something had happened, however. The party was now recognised as one of the major parties in Sweden, and Svensson had become famous. According to many opinion polls, he was the most popular politician in the entire nation.

Several famous people joined the party, and in the right-wing breakthrough national elections of 1991 the party grew explosively yet again and gained over 7% of the votes. The right-wing bloc gained a majority, and KDS formed a government with the right-wing bloc. Several Christian Democrats got positions within the new government: Alf Svensson as the minister of foreign aid (and vice foreign minister), Inger Davidson as minister of civilian infrastructure, and Mats Odell as minister of communications.

After the right-wing bloc lost the 1994 general election, the KDS managed to stay in the Riksdag and had assumed a steady position within Swedish national politics. In 1996 it changed its name to the current form, Christian Democrats (Kristdemokraterna), switching the abbreviation form to KD, in a gesture perceived by elements both inside and outside the party as helping deflect the belief that it was a strictly religious party. In 1998 the party had its best elections ever, gaining over 11% of the votes; it established itself as the fourth-largest party in the Riksdag, becoming larger than its former electoral partner the Centre Party. In the 2002 national elections the party got fewer votes but still held on to its position as the fourth-largest party.

In 2004 Svensson stepped down in favor of his long-designated successor Göran Hägglund.

At the end of 2005 the party had 24,202 confirmed members, making it the fourth-largest party in size as well. Its membership is far more stable than most parties in Sweden. The Christian Democrats are represented in almost every municipality and region in Sweden.

Criticism

The KD has previously held socially conservative views surrounding same sex marriage and in the early 2000s the party was criticized for being opposed to increased rights for homosexuals. In 2007, the KD mostly voted against the introduction of same-sex marriage in parliament, with party leader Göran Hägglund stating "my position is that I have been tasked by the party to argue that marriage is for men and women. When we discuss it between parties we are naturally open and sensitive to each other's arguments and we'll see if we can find a line that allows us to come together." However, the party has since moderated its stance and now supports keeping same-sex marriage legal, albeit saying that churches should make the final decision on whether to perform wedding ceremonies and not the state, and in 2015 voted to change its platform to support same-sex adoption.

Alliance cabinet
As a member of the Alliance for Sweden, the winning side in the 2006 general election, the Christian Democrats got three minister posts in the Cabinet of Fredrik Reinfeldt. The minister posts were held by Göran Hägglund, Mats Odell and Maria Larsson. Unlike the Moderate Party and the Liberal People's Party, the Christian Democrats and the Centre Party avoided scandals for personal conduct and accusations for espionage against the competing Social Democratic Party.

Hägglund, however, received criticism internally for defending the party's pro-choice stance on abortion, which some older members believed had contributed to the decline of the party in recent years. The Alliance cabinet's stance against unemployment and sick-listed benefits have been criticised by former party leader Alf Svensson, while the Sven-Otto Littorin of the Moderate Party went into aggressive counterattack, but the Christian Democratic ministers were silent.

Decline and internal strife
Support of the Christian Democrats significantly declined in the European elections of 2009, where the former party leader Alf Svensson got the party's sole seat in the European Parliament at the expense of the party's top candidate Ella Bohlin. Though Bohlin had run her campaign with a focus on limiting alcohol and outlawing traditional Swedish snuff, Göran Hägglund stated in a speech two weeks after the elections that he wanted to "prohibit the prohibitions" and spoke about the difference between the values of the "people of reality" and the left-wing cultural elite. Some claim that this was not followed up by any political suggestions in the 2010 general election, where the party declined once again. Hägglund was criticized for not being controversial enough by MP Ebba Busch, and it was suggested that around a quarter of the party's representatives would like him to resign. Other commentators have suggested that the party's decrease in support has coincided with the rise of the Sweden Democrats, who gained the support of socially and culturally conservative Swedish voters.

The politics of the Young Christian Democrats have shifted to the right in the past few years, a change that has been attributed to many conservative ex-members of the Moderate Party joining the organization. Swedish political news magazine Fokus has stated that the conflict on traditional Christian moral questions (abortion, gay rights, stem cell research) is secondary to the conflict between those who want a Christian democratic centrist party focused on social responsibility and environmental questions, and those who want a traditional right-wing party focusing on anti-elitism and economic liberalism. The latter group has founded a network called FFFF (Freedom, family, diligence and enterprise), a group that has clear influences from Thatcherism. Christian Democratic youth leader Aron Modig has stated that he wants the Christian Democrats to become the "Tea Party" of Sweden, and push the government when it fails to present a likeminded vision of society.

Election of Ebba Busch

In 2015 the young deputy Mayor of Uppsala Ebba Busch was elected as new party leader. She moved the party towards a new more right-wing and secular position. In the 2018 election she showed herself to be a fierce debater lifting her party from what had been predicted as a sure defeat to the best election result in nearly 20 years.

In 2019 after the new government was announced the KD harhsly criticized the incoming government and the liberal parties supporting it. Too create an alternative to the center-left government the KD opened up to cooperation with the Sweden Democrats This move was popular with the voters and during this period the party saw continually increased support in the opinion polls.

Ahead of the European election the party had reached 13% in the opinion polls, which if it would have been the election result would be the best result for the Christian Democracts ever. This passed after the election when the Swedish newspaper Dagens nyheter posted an article showing the KDs MEP Lars Adaktusson voting no to abortion 22 times while he sat in the European parliament between 2014 and 2019. The situation for the party worsened during the COVID-19 pandemic where, as in most other countries, smaller parties saw a decrease whilst the governments strengthened their support.

2022 election

Ahead of the 2022 election the Christian Democrats continued the party's turn to the right in a number of issues. In migration the party advocates a reduction in the number of refugees let into Sweden by 70%. The party's youth wing, KDU, went out and caused a stir after they proposed repatriation of migrants that have come, and that are coming, to Sweden. Ahead of the Folk och Försvar conference in 2020 the party proposed a doubling of the Swedish Defence budget so that it would meet the 2% of GDP spending each year.

During the 2022 election campaign the party tried to grow by attracting Sweden's rural voters introducing new policies within the area as well as criticizing both the historically agriarian Centre Party and the Social Democrats, accusing them of having abandoned rural Sweden.  The party also recruited former parliamentarian for the Centre Party, Staffan Danielsson and made him head of a party-associated organisation for farmers. Their opponents answered these attacks by calling the KD populist - criticising the use of anti-elitist rhetoric and for unhistorical references to a "made up" Swedish heartland.

The election was not a success for the Christian Democrats losing three MP:s. But as a part of the overall center-right coalition that Ebba Busch had been instrumental in creating the party joined the new Kristersson Cabinet. The party received six ministeral portfolios and Ebba Busch was appointed as Deputy Prime Minister.

Voter base
Ideologically the KD is a centre-right Christian democratic party that during the last few years has shifted to the right and adopted more conservative policies. Historically a large part of its voter base lay among those who belong to evangelical fellowships known in Sweden as free churches (Pentecostals, Methodists, Baptists, etc.) together with likeminded Lutherans (such as Göran Hägglund and Mats Odell). These churches have many followers in Småland and along the Swedish west coast, the regions in which the party is politically strongest. Important voter groups are senior citizens, families, voters in rural areas, members of free churches and citizens that belong to the upper-middle class.

The party is a member of the European People's Party (EPP) and the Centrist Democrat International (CDI).

Electoral results

Parliament (Riksdag)

Regional councils

Municipal councils

European Parliament

Christian Democratic politicians

Party chairman

Vice chairman

Second vice chairman

Party secretary

Group leader in the Riksdag

Other famous Christian democrats
 Peter Althin, MP and judicial spokesman
 Johan DeFarfalla, former Opeth bassist
 Jerzy Einhorn, cancer researcher and MP 1991–1994
 Gert Fylking
 Emma Henriksson
 Carola Häggkvist, singer 
 Bert Karlsson
 Mikael Ljungman
 Bror Stefenson, Chairman of the Christian Democratic Senior League
 Anders Wijkman, MEP

Affiliated organisations
Christian Democratic Youth League  
Christian Democratic Student League  
Christian Democratic Senior League  
Christian Democratic Women's league  
Religious-wing Kristdemokrater för en levande kyrka  
LGB+ organisation Open Christian Democrats  
 The foundation Civitas
 Study organisation Framtidsbildarna

Literature
Niels Arbøl, Kristdemokraterna en världsrörelse (Samhällsgemenskap, 1986) 
Cecilia Hjort Attefall, Partiet som lyfte: 40 år med svensk kristdemokrati: 1964-2004 (Samhällsgemenskap, 2004) 
Birger Ekstedt, KDS - en politisk nödvändighet (Samhällsgemenskap, 1970)
Göran V. Johansson, Kristen Demokrati På Svenska (Liber, 1985) 
Erik Lindfelt, Moralpartiet. En bok om KdS (Carlssons, 1991) 
Bernt Olsson, Upprinnelsen - Om Kristdemokraternas första tid i Sverige (Samhällsgemenskap, 2004) 
Allan Sandström, KDS - Partiet bakom fromhetsvallen (LT, 1979) 
Alf Svensson, I Tiden, från motvind till uppvindar (Samhällsgemenskap, 1984) 
Kristdemokratisk Debatt (paper published by the party between 1992 and 2003) ISSN 1103-1522

See also
Alliance for Sweden
Government of Sweden
Parliament of Sweden
Elections in Sweden
European People's Party

Further reading

References

External links

Kristdemokraterna - Official site 
Christian Democratic Women's League 
Christian Democratic Senior League 
Christian Democratic Youth League 
 Christian Democratic Student League 
CIVITAS - Christian Democratic Foundation 
The Christian Democrat - Christian Democratic newspaper on the net 

 
Christian democratic parties in Europe
1964 establishments in Sweden
Conservative parties in Sweden
Member parties of the European People's Party
Monarchist parties
Political parties established in 1964
Protestant political parties
Right-wing parties in Sweden
Social conservative parties